Acragas may refer to:

 Acragas, an ancient Greek city on the site of modern Agrigento, Sicily
 Acragas (mythology), son of Zeus and the Oceanid Asterope in Greek mythology
 Acragas, one of the Potamoi
 Acragas (silversmith), an engraver or chaser in silver, mentioned by Pliny the Elder
 Acragas (spider), a genus of jumping spiders